Roqui Sanchez (born 17 December 1952) is a French middle-distance runner. He competed in the 800 metres at the 1972 Summer Olympics and the 1976 Summer Olympics.

References

1952 births
Living people
Athletes (track and field) at the 1972 Summer Olympics
Athletes (track and field) at the 1976 Summer Olympics
French male middle-distance runners
Olympic athletes of France
Place of birth missing (living people)
Mediterranean Games bronze medalists for France
Mediterranean Games medalists in athletics
Athletes (track and field) at the 1975 Mediterranean Games
20th-century French people
21st-century French people